Romine Township is located in Marion County, Illinois. As of the 2010 census, its population was 514 and it contained 227 housing units.

Geography 
Romine Township (T1N R4E) is centered at 38°31′N 88°45′W (38.509,-88.763).

Demographics

Adjacent townships 
 Iuka Township (north)
 Garden Hill Township, Wayne County (northeast)
 Orchard Township, Wayne County (east)
 Hickory Hill Township, Wayne County (southeast)
 Farrington Township, Jefferson County (south)
 Field Township, Jefferson County (southwest)
 Haines Township (west)
 Stevenson Township (northwest)

References

External links
US Census
City-data.com
Illinois State Archives

Townships in Marion County, Illinois
Townships in Illinois